Tampa is a city in Marion County, Kansas, United States.  As of the 2020 census the population of the city was 105. It is located between Durham and Ramona and is next to a railroad.

History

Early history

For many millennia, the Great Plains of North America was inhabited by nomadic Native Americans.  From the 16th century to 18th century, the Kingdom of France claimed ownership of large parts of North America. In 1762, after the French and Indian War, France secretly ceded New France to Spain, per the Treaty of Fontainebleau.

19th century
In 1802, Spain returned most of the land to France. In 1803, most of the land for modern day Kansas was acquired by the United States from France as part of the 828,000 square mile Louisiana Purchase for 2.83 cents per acre.

From the 1820s to the 1870s, one of the most significant land routes in the United States was the Santa Fe Trail. It was located along the edge of what would become Tampa. Two Santa Fe Trail markers were located on the trail near Tampa. The trail was active across Marion County from 1821 to 1866.

In 1854, the Kansas Territory was organized, then in 1861 Kansas became the 34th U.S. state. In 1855, Marion County was established within the Kansas Territory, which included the land for modern day Tampa.

In 1887, the Chicago, Kansas and Nebraska Railway built a main line from Herington through Tampa to Pratt. In 1888, this line was extended to Liberal. Later it was extended to Tucumcari, New Mexico and El Paso, Texas. It foreclosed in 1891 and was taken over by Chicago, Rock Island and Pacific Railway, which shut down in 1980 and reorganized as Oklahoma, Kansas and Texas Railroad. The company merged in 1988 with Missouri Pacific Railroad, and merged again in 1997 with Union Pacific Railroad. Most locals still refer to this railroad as the "Rock Island".

The Golden Belt Town Company filed the plat for Tampa in 1887. The source of the city name is said to have been suggested by a railroad engineer who rode one of the first trains through Tampa.  Tampa was incorporated as a city in 1908.

A post office was established in Tampa on April 17, 1888.

Geography
Tampa is located at coordinates 38.5472314, -97.1530774 in the scenic Flint Hills and Great Plains of the state of Kansas.

Area attractions
Tampa has one building listed on the National Register of Historic Places (NRHP).
 1910 P.H. Meehan House (NRHP), 401 North Columbus Street, not open to public
 Santa Fe Trail
 Santa Fe Trail Markers, numerous markers in the area
 Santa Fe Trail Self-Guided Auto Tour.

Demographics

2010 census
As of the census of 2010, there were 112 people, 48 households, and 27 families residing in the city. The racial makeup of the city was 98.2% White and 1.8% Native American. Hispanic or Latino of any race were 0.9% of the population.

There were 48 households, of which 22.9% had children under the age of 18 living with them, 50.0% were married couples living together, 6.3% had a female householder with no husband present, and 43.8% were non-families. 43.8% of all households were made up of individuals, and 23% had someone living alone who was 65 years of age or older. The average household size was 2.33 and the average family size was 3.19.

The median age in the city was 45 years. 28.6% of residents were under the age of 18; 5.4% were between the ages of 18 and 24; 16.1% were from 25 to 44; 23.2% were from 45 to 64; and 26.8% were 65 years of age or older. The gender makeup of the city was 58.9% male and 41.1% female.

2000 census
As of the census of 2000, there were 144 people, 59 households, and 37 families residing in the city. The racial makeup of the city was 93.06% White, and 6.94% from two or more races. Hispanic or Latino of any race were 9.03% of the population.

There were 59 households, out of which 30.5% had children under the age of 18 living with them, 50.8% were married couples living together, 11.9% had a female householder with no husband present, and 35.6% were non-families. 33.9% of all households were made up of individuals, and 25.4% had someone living alone who was 65 years of age or older. The average household size was 2.44 and the average family size was 3.21.

In the city, the population was spread out, with 30.6% under the age of 18, 6.9% from 18 to 24, 21.5% from 25 to 44, 16.7% from 45 to 64, and 24.3% who were 65 years of age or older. The median age was 36 years. For every 100 females, there were 105.7 males. For every 100 females age 18 and over, there were 88.7 males.

As of 2000 the median income for a household in the city was $18,125, and the median income for a family was $42,083. Males had a median income of $25,000 versus $23,125 for females. The per capita income for the city was $12,677. There were 6.9% of families and 15.6% of the population living below the poverty line, including 25.7% of under eighteens and 11.1% of those over 64.

Economy
Tampa is home to Tampa State Bank and Tampa Cafe.

Government
The Tampa government consists of a mayor and five council members. The council meets the 1st Monday of each month at 7PM (winter) or 8PM (summer).
 City Hall, 113 W 3rd.
 Fire Department, 302 N Main St.

Education
The community is served by Centre USD 397 public school district. The high school is a member of T.E.E.N., a shared video teaching network between five area high schools.
 Centre School; 2374 310th St, Lost Springs, KS; between Lost Springs and Lincolnville, east of the U.S. 77 highway

Tampa High School was closed through school unification. The Tampa High School mascot was Tampa Tigers.

Media

Print
 The Herington Times, newspaper from Herington.
 Marion County Record, newspaper from Marion.
 Hillsboro Free Press, free newspaper for greater Marion County area.

Infrastructure

Transportation
The K-15 highway is 3.75 mi W of the city. Tampa is served by the Union Pacific Railroad, formerly the Southern Pacific, and formerly the Chicago, Rock Island and Pacific Railroad. Tampa is located on UP's Golden State main line to El Paso, Texas and still serves the Tampa Elevator during summer harvests.

Utilities
 Internet
 Fiber Optics is provided by TCT.
 Satellite is provided by HughesNet, StarBand, WildBlue.
 TV
 Fiber Optics is provided by TCT.
 Satellite is provided by DirecTV, Dish Network.
 Terrestrial is provided by regional digital TV stations.
 Telephone
 Fiber Optics is provided by TCT.
 Electricity 
 Rural is provided by Flint Hills RECA.
 Water
 Rural is provided by Marion County RWD #1.

See also
 National Register of Historic Places listings in Marion County, Kansas
 Historical Maps of Marion County, Kansas
 1953 Flint–Worcester tornado outbreak sequence

References

Further reading

 A History of Tampa, Kansas, and Its Environs, 1887–1987; Tampa Centennial Committee; 1986.

External links

City
 Tampa - Directory of Public Officials, League of Kansas Municipalities
Historical
 Marion County cemetery list, archive of KsGenWeb
 Marion County history bibliography,  Marion County school bibliography, Kansas Historical Society
Maps
 Tampa city map, KDOT
 Topo Map of Tampa / Durham / Ramona / Dillon / Elmo area, USGS

Cities in Kansas
Cities in Marion County, Kansas
Populated places established in 1887
1887 establishments in Kansas